Day of Mourning is the fourth studio album by Canadian deathcore band Despised Icon. It was released September 22, 2009 through Century Media Records. The album is featured in four different editions, including; the standard, the United States exclusive Hot Topic edition, the Europe Exclusive LTD digipak edition, the iTunes edition and the Japanese edition.

Background
Day of Mourning was recorded during early 2009 at  Projecson Recording Studio and was produced by their former guitarist, Yannick, St-Amand and was mixed by Andreas Magnusson and mastered by Alan Douches. The album marks the first Despised Icon release to feature guitarist Ben Landreville and bassist Max Lavelle in the band.

The song "MVP" was released as the album's first single on July 17, 2009. The title track was released as the album's second single and had a music video produced for it which was directed by Montreal hip hop video production company, Kartel Films. The song "Day of Mourning" is also featured as downloadable content for the Rock Band video games via the Rock Band Network.

Reception

The album reached number 162 on the Billboard 200 and number 6 on the Billboard Top Heatseekers, selling 3,000 copies its first week of release.

Track listing

Credits
Writing, performance and production credits are adapted from the album liner notes.

Personnel
Despised Icon
 Alex Erian – vocals
 Steve Marois – vocals
 Eric Jarrin – guitar
 Ben Landreville – guitar, gang vocals
 Max Lavelle – bass guitar
 Alex Pelletier – drums

Additional musicians
 Kevin McCoughey (Ion Dissonance) – gang vocals
 Gabriel McCoughry (ex-Ion Dissonance) – gang vocals
 Elliot Desgagné (Beneath the Massacre) – gang vocals
 Ghyslain Fredet – gang vocals
 Sebastien Painchaud (ex-Ion Dissonance) – gang vocals
 Chris Donaldson (Cryptopsy) – gang vocals

Production
 Yannick St-Amand – production, engineering
 Chris Donaldson – recording (gang vocals only)
 Eric Jarrin – recording (guitar solos only)
 Andreas Magnusson – mixing
 Alan Douches – mastering

Artwork and design
 Felix Rancourt – artwork, layout

Studios
 Northern Studio, QC, Canada – production, engineering
 Garage Studio, QC, Canada – recording (gang vocals only)
 Eric Jarrin's place, QC, Canada – recording (guitar solos only)
 Planet Red Studio, VA, USA – mixing
 West West Side Music, NJ, USA – mastering

Charts

References

External links
 Day of Mourning at Despised Icon's official website
 

2009 albums
Century Media Records albums
Despised Icon albums
French-language albums